Let Love In is the eighth studio album by Nick Cave and the Bad Seeds, released on 18 April 1994 on Mute Records.

As of May 2015 it was certified silver by British Phonographic Industry for 60,000 sold units in UK. As of January 1996 the album has sold 50,000 copies in United States.

Track listing
All songs written by Cave unless otherwise stated.

"Do You Love Me?" – 5:56 (Words: Cave. Music Cave, Casey)
"Nobody's Baby Now" – 3:52
"Loverman" – 6:21
"Jangling Jack" – 2:47
"Red Right Hand" – 6:10 (Words: Cave. Music: Cave, Harvey, Wydler)
"I Let Love In" – 4:14
"Thirsty Dog" – 3:48
"Ain't Gonna Rain Anymore" – 3:46
"Lay Me Low" – 5:08
"Do You Love Me? (Part 2)" – 6:12

Singles
"Do You Love Me?" (MUTE 160) (28 March 1994)
b/w: "Cassiel's Song"/"Sail Away"
"Loverman" (MUTE 169) (4 July 1994)
b/w: "B-Side"/"(I'll Love You) Till the End of the World"
"Red Right Hand" (MUTE 172) (24 October 1994)
b/w: "That's What Jazz Is to Me"/"Where the Action Is"

Personnel
Nick Cave and the Bad Seeds
Blixa Bargeld – guitar (1-10), backing vocals (1, 3, 4, 7-10), vocals (4)
Martyn P. Casey – bass guitar (1-10), backing vocals (1, 4, 7, 9)
Nick Cave – vocals (1-10), organ (1, 3, 5, 7-9), backing vocals (1, 4, 7, 9), piano (1, 8), electric piano (10), oscillator (5), bells (3)
Mick Harvey – guitar (1-9), backing vocals (1, 3, 4, 7, 9, 10), organ (2, 4, 6), drums (4, 9), string arrangement (8, 10), bells (5), tambourine (6), shaker (5)
Conway Savage – backing vocals (1, 4, 6-9), piano (2-4, 6,  8)
Thomas Wydler – drums (1-3, 5-10), tambourine (4, 8), timpani (5), shaker (3), triangle (3), temple block [fish] (5), backing vocals (1, 4, 7, 9)

Guest musicians
Tex Perkins – backing vocals on "Do You Love Me?"
Rowland S. Howard – backing vocals on "Do You Love Me?"
Mick Geyer – backing vocals on "Jangling Jack"
Nick Seferi – backing vocals on "Jangling Jack"
Spencer P. Jones – backing vocals on "Ain't Gonna Rain Anymore"
Robin Casinader – violin on "Ain't Gonna Rain Anymore" and "Do You Love Me? (Part 2)"
Warren Ellis – violin on "Ain't Gonna Rain Anymore" and "Do You Love Me? (Part 2)"
David McComb – backing vocals on "Lay Me Low"
Donna McEvitt – backing vocals on "Do You Love Me? (Part 2)"
Katharine Blake – backing vocals on "Do You Love Me? (Part 2)"

Cover versions
"Do You Love Me" was covered by the band New Waver as "Do You Hate Me" in 1996. The song "Loverman" was covered by Metallica on Garage Inc. (1998) and Depeche Mode's Martin Gore on his solo album Counterfeit² (2003). The song "Red Right Hand" was covered by Arctic Monkeys as a B-side to their single "Crying Lightning" and as a bonus track on the Japanese version of their third album Humbug (2009); it was also covered by Giant Sand on their album "Cover Magazine". "Red Right Hand" was covered by PJ Harvey as the theme song for the English television show, Peaky Blinders.

Charts

Certifications

References

1994 albums
Nick Cave albums
Mute Records albums
Albums produced by Tony Cohen